Ronald Lindsay André "Ron" Langevin (born September 28, 1940) is a Canadian forensic psychologist at the University of Toronto. He is the founding editor of Annals of Sex Research, now titled Sexual Abuse: A Journal of Research and Treatment.

Life and career
Langevin was born in Montreal and earned a Ph.D. in psychology from University of Toronto in 1970. He wrote materials for the Canadian Council for Research in Education before taking a position at the Clarke Institute of Psychiatry, where he worked with Kurt Freund.

Langevin argued against the effectiveness of reparative therapy in 1985. He served as an expert witness in a sexual abuse trial in 1989. In 1989 also, Langevin published findings suggesting a correlation between sex offenders and traumatic brain injury, though he suggested caution in the use of the findings, as half his subjects were alcohol abusers.

He is director of Juniper Associates Psychological Services and is an Associate Professor in the Law & Mental Health program at University of Toronto. He has also published materials through Juniper Press. Langevin is a charter member of the International Association for the Treatment of Sexual Offenders (IATSO).

Selected bibliography

Langevin R, Curnoe S. Psychopathy, ADHD, and brain dysfunction as predictors of lifetime recidivism among sex offenders. Int J Offender Ther Comp Criminol. 2011 Feb;55(1):5-26. Epub 2010 Feb 3. 
Langevin R, Curnoe S. Are the mentally retarded and learning disordered overrepresented among sex offenders and paraphilics? Int J Offender Ther Comp Criminol. 2008 Aug;52(4):401-15. Epub 2007 Aug 23. 
Langevin R, Langevin M, Curnoe S. Family size, birth order, and parental age among male paraphilics and sex offenders. Arch Sex Behav. 2007 Aug;36(4):599-609. 
Langevin R. Sexual offenses and traumatic brain injury. Brain Cogn. 2006 Mar;60(2):206-7. 
Langevin R, Curnoe S, Bain J. A study of clerics who commit sexual offenses: are they different from other sex offenders? Child Abuse Negl. 2000 Apr;24(4):535-45. 
Langevin R, Glancy GD, Curnoe S, Bain J. Physicians who commit sexual offences: are they different from other sex offenders? Can J Psychiatry. 1999 Oct;44(8):775-80.  
Langevin R, Wright P, Handy L (1988). The sex killer. Ann Sex Res Volume 1, Number 2, 263-301,  
Langevin R, Bain J, Wortzman G, Hucker S, Dickey R, Wright P. Sexual sadism: brain, blood, and behavior. Ann N Y Acad Sci. 1988;528:163-71. 
Langevin R, Ben-Aron M, Wortzman G, Dickey R, Handy L (1987). Brain damage, diagnosis, and substance abuse among violent offenders Behavioral Sciences & the Law Volume 5, Issue 1, pages 77–94, Winter 1987
Langevin R (1983). Sexual strands: understanding and treating sexual anomalies in men. Psychology Press, 
Paitich D, Langevin R, Freeman R, Mann K, Handy L. The Clarke SHQ: a clinical sex history questionnaire for males. Arch Sex Behav. 1977 Sep;6(5):421-36. 
Paitich D, Langevin R. The Clarke Parent-Child Relations Questionnaire: a clinically useful test for adults. J Consult Clin Psychol. 1976 Jun;44(3):428-36.  
Freund K, Langevin R, Wescom T, Zajac Y. Heterosexual interest in homosexual males. Arch Sex Behav. 1975 Sep;4(5):509-18. 
Freund K, Langevin R, Zajac Y. Heterosexual aversion in homosexual males. A second experiment. Br J Psychiatry. 1974 Aug;125(0):177-80. 
Freund K, Langevin R, Zajac Y, Steiner B, Zajac A. The trans-sexual syndrome in homosexual males. J Nerv Ment Dis. 1974 Feb;158(2):145-53. 
Freund K, Langevin R, Cibiri S, Zajac Y. Heterosexual aversion in homosexual males. Br J Psychiatry. 1973 Feb;122(567):163-9.

References

External links
Dr. Ronald A. Langevin profile via University of Toronto
Ronald L. A. Langevin profile College of Psychologists of Ontario

Living people
1940 births
Canadian psychologists
Forensic psychologists
Academic staff of the University of Toronto
University of Toronto alumni